The Rhythm Room is a roots, blues, and concert club located in Phoenix, Arizona.  It is the venue of nationally known acts on an almost nightly basis.  In 2003 the club was named by the Phoenix New Times as the "Best Club for Blues" in its "Best of Phoenix" awards.  In July of that same year the club hosted a live recording session by an 88-year-old Robert Lockwood, Jr. The resulting performance, Legend Live, was released the following year by M.C. Records.  A 2001 Hightone Records compilation, Rhythm Room Blues (LIVE), also captured live performances from the venue by R. L. Burnside, Kim Wilson, Sonny Rhodes, and others.

Singer-songwriter Robert Earl Keen describes a concert performed at the Rhythm Room in his song, "Furnace Fan" on his 2003 release, Farm Fresh Onions.  Keen, however, misidentifies the club's location as being in the adjacent community of Scottsdale, Arizona.

External links 
 Official web site and concert schedule
 2003 review in the Phoenix New Times
 2004 review in the Arizona Republic

Music venues in Arizona
Music of Phoenix, Arizona
Buildings and structures in Phoenix, Arizona
Tourist attractions in Phoenix, Arizona
1991 establishments in Arizona